David Kossoff (24 November 1919 – 23 March 2005) was a British actor. In 1954 he won the BAFTA Award for Most Promising Newcomer to Leading Film Roles for his appearance as Geza Szobek  in The Young Lovers. He played Alf Larkin in TV sitcom The Larkins and Professor Kokintz in The Mouse that Roared (1959) and its sequel The Mouse on the Moon (1963).

Because of the drug use of his son Paul, a blues rock musician, who subsequently died, he became an anti-drug campaigner. In 1971 he was also actively involved in the Nationwide Festival of Light, an organisation protesting against the commercial exploitation of sex and violence, and advocating the teachings of Christ as the key to re-establishing moral stability in Britain.

Life and career
Kossoff was born in Hackney, London, the youngest of three children, to poor Russian-Jewish parents, Annie (née Shaklovich) and Lewis (Louis) Kossoff (1882–1943). His father was a tailor. His older brother Alec changed his name to Alan Keith. The middle sister was named Sarah Rebecca (Sadie). 

He attended the Northern Polytechnic, leaving in 1937 to work as a draughtsman and then a furniture designer for a year before becoming an actor.

Kossoff started working in light entertainment on British television in the years following World War II, during which he briefly served in the military. His first stage appearance was at the Unity Theatre in 1942 at the age of 23. He took part in numerous plays and films. He was a Member of the Society of Artists and Designers. In addition to this, he was a Fellow of the Royal Society of Arts.

His best-known television roles were the hen-pecked husband Alf Larkin in The Larkins, first broadcast in 1958, and a Jewish furniture maker in A Little Big Business. Film credits included his role as Soviet diplomat Geza Szobek The Young Lovers (1954 – for which he won a British Academy Film Award as Most Promising Newcomer to Film), A Kid for Two Farthings (1955), his role as Morry in the Oscar-winning The Bespoke Overcoat (1956), Professor Kokintz in The Mouse that Roared (1959), starring Peter Sellers,  and its sequel The Mouse on the Moon (1963) with Bernard Cribbins. He played Sigmund Freud's father in Freud: The Secret Passion (1962) with Montgomery Clift in the lead.

He was also well known for his story-telling skills, particularly with regard to reinterpreting the Bible. His best-known book, also a television series, is The Book of Witnesses (1971), in which he turned the Gospels into a series of monologues. He also retold dozens of Old Testament and Apocrypha stories in Bible Stories (1968).

In 1953, he played the character Lemuel "Lemmy" Barnet in the British sci-fi radio series Journey into Space.

He married Margaret (Jennie) Jenkins and had two sons, Paul and Simon. Following the death in 1976 of his son Paul, guitarist with the band Free, Kossoff established the Paul Kossoff Foundation which aimed to present the realities of drug addiction to children. Kossoff spent the remainder of his life campaigning against drugs. In the late 1970s and early 1980s, he toured with a one-man stage performance about the death of his son and its effect on the family.

He died in 2005 of liver cancer at age 85. He was cremated and interred at the Golders Green Crematorium. In its obituary, The Scotsman wrote that David Kossoff was "a man of deep convictions and proud of his Jewish origins".

Filmography

 Rookery Nook ('live' TV, 1953) – Harold Twine
 The Good Beginning (1953) – Dealer
 The Young Lovers (1954) – Geza Szobek
 The Angel Who Pawned Her Harp (1954) – Schwartz
 Svengali (1954) – Gecko
 A Kid for Two Farthings (1955) – Avrom Kandinsky
 I Am a Camera (1955) – Minor role
 The Woman for Joe (1955) – Max
 The Bespoke Overcoat (1955, Short) – Morry
 Now and Forever (1956) – Pawnbroker
 1984 (1956) – Charrington
 Who Done It? (1956) – Zacco
 Wicked as They Come (1956) – Sam Lewis
 The Iron Petticoat (1956) – Anton Antonovich Dubratz
 House of Secrets (1956) – Henryk van de Heide
 Count Five and Die (1957) – Dr. Mulder
 The Dock Brief (1957 BBC-TV film) - Herbert Fowle
 Innocent Sinners (1958) – Vincent
 Indiscreet (1958) – Carl Banks
 The Journey (1959) – Simon Avron
 The Mouse That Roared (1959) – Alfred Kokintz
 Jet Storm (1959) – Dr Bergstein
 The House of the Seven Hawks (1959) – Wilhelm Dekker
 Conspiracy of Hearts (1960) – The Rabbi
 Inn for Trouble (1960) – Alf Larkins
 The Two Faces of Dr. Jekyll (1960) – Ernst Litauer
 Freud: The Secret Passion (1962) – Jacob Freud
 Summer Holiday (1963) – Magistrate
 The Mouse on the Moon (1963) – Professor Kokintz
 Ring of Spies (1964) – Peter Kroger
 One Million Years B.C. (1966) – Narrator (uncredited)
 Three for All (1975) – Airport Passenger
 The London Connection (1979) – Professor Buchinski
 Staggered (1994) – Elderly Man (final film role)

References

External links

1919 births
2005 deaths
20th-century English male actors
English male film actors
English male stage actors
English male television actors
English people of Russian-Jewish descent
Jewish English male actors
Male actors from London
Male actors from Hertfordshire
People from Hatfield, Hertfordshire
People from Hackney Central
Alumni of the University of North London
British Army personnel of World War II
Deaths from liver cancer
Deaths from cancer in England
Golders Green Crematorium
Free (band)
BAFTA Most Promising Newcomer to Leading Film Roles winners
Kossoff family